C. Sivasami is an Indian politician and incumbent Member of Indian Parliament elected from Tamil Nadu.

MLA 
He was elected to the Tamil Nadu legislative assembly as an Anna Dravida Munnetra Kazhagam candidate from Tiruppur constituency in 2001 election.  He lost the election from the same constituency in 1996 election against the Communist Party of India candidate K. Subbarayan.

Member of Parliament 
He was elected to the Lok Sabha from Tiruppur constituency as an Anna Dravida Munnetra Kazhagam candidate in 2009 election.

References 

All India Anna Dravida Munnetra Kazhagam politicians
Living people
Lok Sabha members from Tamil Nadu
India MPs 2009–2014
People from Tiruppur
Year of birth missing (living people)